Cacosternum is a genus of frog in the family Pyxicephalidae that are found in southern and eastern Africa. They have many common names, including cacos, dainty frogs, and metal frogs.

Species
The genus contains 16 species:
 Cacosternum aggestum Channing, Schmitz, Burger, and Kielgast, 2013
 Cacosternum australis Channing, Schmitz, Burger, and Kielgast, 2013
 Cacosternum boettgeri (Boulenger, 1882) – Boettger's dainty frog
 Cacosternum capense Hewitt, 1925 – Cape caco
 Cacosternum karooicum Boycott, de Villiers, and Scott, 2002 – Karoo dainty frog
 Cacosternum kinangopensis Channing and Schmitz, 2009
 Cacosternum leleupi Laurent, 1950 – Katanga caco
 Cacosternum namaquense Werner, 1910 – Namaqua caco
 Cacosternum nanogularum Channing, Schmitz, Burger, and Kielgast, 2013
 Cacosternum nanum Boulenger, 1887 – bronze caco
 Cacosternum parvum Poynton, 1963 – mountain caco
 Cacosternum platys Rose, 1950 – flat caco
 Cacosternum plimptoni Channing, Brun, Burger, Febvre, and Moyer, 2005
 Cacosternum rhythmum Channing, Schmidtz, Burger, and Kielgast, 2013
 Cacosternum striatum FitzSimons, 1947 – striped caco
 Cacosternum thorini Conradie, 2014

Cacosternum poyntoni, Poynton's caco, is now considered a synonym of Cacosternum nanum.

References

 
Amphibians of Africa
Pyxicephalidae
Amphibian genera
Taxa named by George Albert Boulenger
Taxonomy articles created by Polbot